Kappad, or Kappakadavu locally, is a beach and village near Koyilandy, in the district Kozhikode, Kerala, India.

A stone monument installed by government commemorates the "landing" by Vasco da Gama with the inscription, 'Vasco da Gama landed here, Kappakadavu, in the year 1498'.

In 2007 a Rs. 1.5 crore program to beautify the beach was launched by [Kerala] Tourism Minister Kodiyeri Balakrishnan. It is now completed and Kappad beach has a corniche and park. The park includes a restroom, restaurant and seating.

The nearest major railway station is Koyilandy, about 10 km away from Kappad. The nearest airport is Calicut International Airport (CCJ), which is about 25 km from the town of Kozhikode. Private transport buses are available from the main bus stand, or visitors can reach the beach by stopping at Thiruvangoor on National Highway 66 between Kozhikode and Vadakara.

See also
 Bekal beach
 Muzhappilangad Beach
 Kozhikode Beach
 Moodadi
 Chengottukavu
 Arikkulam
 Thikkodi
 Chemancheri
 Atholi
 Ulliyeri
 Cheekilode
 Nochad
 Koyilandy
 Chemancheri railway station

References

Beaches of Kozhikode district
Villages in Kozhikode district